Jean Louis Ghislain Borremans (14 May 1911, in Kasteelbrakel – 8 February 1968, in Brussels) was a Belgian politician from the communist party PCB. 

Borremans was a labourer and communist Member of Parliament. He was arrested in April 1941 with another Brussels delegate of the party, Jules Vanderlinden, and deported to a concentration camp. He survived the war and returned to politics in the 1950s.

Political career
 1939 - 1949: Representative for the electoral district Nijvel
 1946 - 1947: Minister of Public Works
 1950 - 1954: Representative for the electoral district Nijvel

External links
Crisp, ministers in the Huysmans Cabinet
Crisp, ministers in the Van Acker Cabinet

1911 births
1968 deaths
Belgian communists
Flemish politicians
People from Braine-le-Château